The Treaty of El Pardo signed on 11 March 1778 sought to end conflict between Spain and Portugal in the Río de la Plata region, along the modern boundary between Argentina and Uruguay. It confirmed   Spanish ownership of Colonia del Sacramento, now in Uruguay, while Portugal ceded possession of strategically important territories in Africa, now the modern state of Equatorial Guinea. In return, Spain withdrew from lands to the north, most of which are in the southern Brazilian state of Rio Grande do Sul.

Background
For nearly 300 years, differing interpretations of the Treaty of Tordesillas led to border disputes between Spain and Portugal over the Río de la Plata region. Portuguese encroachments in this area allowed their merchants to evade commercial restrictions imposed by Spain on the importation of goods into Spanish South America. This culminated in 1690 when Portugal established the trading post of Colonia del Sacramento, just across the river from Buenos Aires which became a major centre for smuggled goods. 

The two countries attempted to settle this dispute by the 1750 Treaty of Madrid but it was annulled by Charles III of Spain in 1761. Spain entered the Seven Years' War on the side of France in 1762; their invasion of Portugal ended in disaster, but they captured Colonia del Sacramento and lands now in the southern Brazilian state of Rio Grande do Sul. Although forced to return Colonia del Sacramento and other Portuguese possessions under Article XXI of the 1763 Treaty of Paris, Spain retained its gains in Rio Grande, since they argued these lands were in fact Spanish.  

As a result, over the next decade Portugal reoccupied Rio Grande in an undeclared war before formal hostilities commenced in the 1776-1777 Spanish–Portuguese War. In February 1777, a Spanish expeditionary force of 116 ships and 19,000 troops captured the island of Santa Catarina in February before moving against Colonia del Sacramento which surrendered in July. Fighting ended in February 1777 when Joseph I of Portugal died and his daughter, Spanish-born Maria I, sued for peace. The October 1777 First Treaty of San Ildefonso established a Boundary Commission to demarcate borders in the Río de la Plata region, which were later confirmed by the Treaty of El Pardo.

Provisions
The Treaty confirmed the findings of the Boundary Commission; Portugal ceded Colonia del Sacramento to Spain, which in turn withdrew from lands to the north. It also included a number of commercial clauses, the most significant being the regulation of the tobacco and Atlantic slave trade. Spain regained bases for the West African slave trade it had relinquished in the 1479 Treaty of Alcáçovas, acquiring the Portuguese islands of Annobón and Bioko, or Fernão Pó, plus the mainland between the Niger River and the Ogoue River. These possessions were administered by the Spanish Viceroyalty of the Rio de la Plata, based in Buenos Aires.

Aftermath

Spanish hopes the border settlement would assist economic growth were hampered by the 1779-1783 war with Britain, which restricted trade with mainland Spain and led to high tariffs and taxes to pay for it. 

Links between the Spanish central government and their overseas possessions were weakened during the Napoleonic Wars, while Portugal regained the Misiones Orientales in 1801, but despite this, the colonists successfully repulsed British invasions of the River Plate in 1806 and 1807. The Spanish American wars of independence between 1809 to 1829 resulted in the independence of Spanish colonies in the Americas, the Viceroyalty of Río de la Plata being dissolved during the 1810-1818 Argentine War of Independence. 

The African territories awarded to Spain under the Treaty of El Pardo became the colony of Spanish Guinea. Annobón and Bioko had been relatively neglected by the Portuguese, who had focused instead on São Tomé; with the gradual abolition of the transatlantic slave trade in the first half of the 19th century, these lost much of their value to Spain. In 1968, Spanish Guinea became the independent state of Equatorial Guinea.

Footnotes

References

Sources

External links
WHKMLA: Spanish Guinea, 1781-1885
World Statesmen: Equatorial Guinea

1778 treaties
Treaties involving territorial changes
Treaties of the Kingdom of Portugal
Treaties of the Spanish Empire
1778 in Portugal
1778 in Spain
1770s in Africa
1770s in South America
Colonial Brazil
History of Central Africa
History of Equatorial Guinea